The Battle of Bibracte was fought between the Helvetii and six Roman legions, under the command of Gaius Julius Caesar. It was the second major battle of the Gallic Wars.

Prelude
The Helvetii, a confederation of Gallic tribes, had begun a total migration of its peoples in March of 58 BC. This alarmed the Romans and began the Gallic Wars.

Julius Caesar was the governor of Transalpine Gaul, and by the time of battle had between 24,000 and 30,000 legionary troops, and some quantity of auxiliaries, many of whom were themselves Gauls. He marched north to the river Saône, where he caught the Helvetii in the middle of crossing. Some three-quarters had crossed, but he slaughtered those who had not. Caesar then crossed the river in one day using a pontoon bridge. Next, he followed the Helvetii, but refused to engage in combat, waiting for ideal conditions. Negotiations were attempted, but Caesar's terms were draconian (likely on purpose, as Caesar may have used it as a delaying tactic). Caesar's supplies ran thin around 20 June and he was forced to travel towards allied territory in Bibracte, as while his army had easily crossed the Saône, his supply train had not. Bibracte was approximately 18 miles away from their camp to obtain the supplies promised by his allies, the Aedui, in whose lands the Helvetii were crossing. Dumnorix, an Aedui chieftain opposed to the Romans, had been delaying supplies from reaching Caesar's army. The Helvetii used this moment to attack Caesar's rearguard.

Battle
Informed by deserters from the allied auxiliary cavalry of Lucius Aemilius (the commander of the cavalry), the Helvetii decided to harass Caesar's rear guard. When Caesar observed this, he sent his cavalry to delay the attack. He then placed the Seventh (Legio VII Claudia), Eighth (Legio VIII Augusta), Ninth (Legio IX Hispana), and Tenth legions (Legio X Equestris), organized in Roman fashion (triplex acies, or "triple battle order"), at the foot of a nearby hill, the top of which he occupied himself, along with the Eleventh (Legio XI Claudia) and Twelfth (Legio XII Fulminata) Legions and all his auxiliaries. His baggage train was assembled near the summit, where it could be guarded by the forces there.

Having driven off Caesar's cavalry and with their own baggage train secured, the Helvetii engaged "In the seventh hour", approximately noon or one o'clock. According to Caesar, his hilltop battle line easily threw back the onslaught by using pila (javelins/throwing spears). The Roman legionaries then drew swords and advanced downhill wading into their opponents. Many Helvetii warriors had pila sticking out of their shields and threw them aside to fight unencumbered, but this also made them more vulnerable. The legions drove the Helvetii back toward the hill where their baggage train sat.

While the legions pursued the Helvetii across the plain between the hills, the Boii and the Tulingi arrived with fifteen thousand men to assist the Helvetii, flanking the Romans on one side. At that point, the Helvetii returned to the battle in earnest. When the Tulingi and the Boii started circumventing the Romans, Caesar regrouped his third line to resist the assault of the Boii and Tulingi, keeping his primary and secondary committed to chasing the Helvetii.

The battle lasted many hours into the night, until the Romans finally took the Helvetic baggage train, capturing both a daughter and a son of Orgetorix. According to Caesar, 130,000 enemies escaped, of which 110,000 survived the retreat. Unable to pursue on account of battle wounds and the time it took to bury the dead, Caesar rested three days before he followed the fleeing Helvetii. These, in turn, had managed to reach the territory of the Lingones within four days of the battle. Caesar warned the Lingones not to assist them, prompting the Helvetii and their allies to surrender.

Aftermath

Casualties
Caesar claimed that of the 368,000 Helvetii and allies, only 130,000 got away, of whom 110,000 returned home. Orosius, probably drawing on the works of Caesar's general Asinius Pollio, gave an original strength of 157,000 for the barbarians, adding that 47,000 died during the campaign. Strabo states an even lower figure, with only 8,000 escaping the battle, an estimate assessed as plausible by Hans Delbrück.

Historian David Henige takes particular issue with the supposed population and warrior counts. Caesar claims that he was able to estimate the population of the Helvetii because in their camp there was a census, written in Greek on tablets, which would have indicated 263,000 Helvetii and 105,000 allies, of whom exactly one quarter (92,000) were combatants. But Henige points out that such a census would have been difficult to achieve by the Gauls, that it would make no sense to be written in Greek by non-Greek tribes, and that carrying such a large quantity of stone or wood tablets on their migration would have been a monumental feat. Henige finds it oddly convenient that exactly one quarter were combatants, suggesting that the numbers were more likely ginned up by Caesar than outright counted by census. Even contemporary authors estimated that the population of the Helvetii and their allies were lower, Livy surmised that there were 157,000 overall. But Henige still believes this number inaccurate. Hans Delbrück estimates that there were at most 20,000 migrating Helvetii, of whom 12,000 were warriors. Gilliver thinks that there were not more than 50,000 men in the Gallic army.

Also according to Caesar the census totals of the tribes at the start of the war were:

References

Bibliography

Caesar's Gallic War – direct translation from Latin
Delbrück, Hans. History of the Art of War Vol I. 
Goldsworthy, Adrian. Caesar: Life of a Colossus. New Haven: Yale University Press, 2007. 220-223.

Bibracte
Boii
Helvetii
Bibracte
Bibracte
History of Saône-et-Loire
58 BC
Bibracte